Richard Thomas Griffiths  (31 July 1947 – 28 March 2013) was an English actor of film, television, and stage. He is known for his portrayals of Vernon Dursley in the Harry Potter films (2001-2010), Uncle Monty in Withnail and I (1987), and Henry Crabbe in Pie in the Sky (1994–1997). Over his career he received numerous accolades including a Tony Award and Olivier Award as well as a nomination for a BAFTA Award. He was appointed an Officer of the Order of the British Empire (OBE) by Queen Elizabeth II in 2008.

For his performance in the stage play The History Boys, Griffiths won the Tony Award for Best Actor in a Play and a Laurence Olivier Award for Best Actor in a Play. For the 2006 film adaptation, Griffiths was nominated for the BAFTA Award for Best Actor in a Leading Role. Griffiths' is also known for his performances at the National Theatre including Equus (2008), The Habit of Art (2010), and The Sunshine Boys (2012).

Earlier in his career, he had supporting roles in such critically acclaimed films as Chariots of Fire (1981), The French Lieutenant's Woman (1981), Gandhi (1982), A Private Function (1984), Venus (2006), Ballet Shoes (2007), and Hugo (2011). He also appeared in the commercial films Sleepy Hollow (1999), The Hitchhiker's Guide to the Galaxy (2005), Bedtime Stories (2008), and Pirates of the Caribbean: On Stranger Tides (2011).

Early years
Richard Thomas Griffiths was born in Thornaby-on-Tees, North Riding of Yorkshire, to Jane (née Denmark, 1923–1969) and Thomas Griffiths (1915–1976). His father was a steelworker who also fought in pubs for money, while his mother's occupation was described as "bagger". He had an elder sister and two elder brothers, all of whom died in infancy before he was born. He was brought up as a Roman Catholic.

As a boy he was so skinny that he was given radiation therapy on his pituitary gland when he was eight years old. This permanently slowed his metabolism, making him struggle with obesity for the rest of his life.

His parents were both deaf and he became fluent in British Sign Language at an early age. During his childhood he attempted to run away from home many times. He dropped out of Our Lady & St Bede School in Stockton-on-Tees at the age of 15 and worked as a porter for Littlewoods for a while but his boss eventually persuaded him to go back to school. He decided to attend a drama class at Stockton & Billingham College. He continued his education in drama at Manchester Polytechnic School of Theatre (now Manchester School of Theatre) at the same time as Bernard Hill.

Career

After graduating, Griffiths won a contract on BBC Radio with their Radio Drama Company. He also worked in small theatres, sometimes acting and sometimes managing. He built up an early reputation as a Shakespearean clown with portrayals of Pompey in Measure for Measure and Bottom in A Midsummer Night's Dream with the Royal Shakespeare Company and went on to play the Kings in Love's Labour's Lost and in Henry VIII. He eventually settled in Manchester and began to get lead roles in plays. From there, he began to appear on television and then got his big break in film in It Shouldn't Happen to a Vet (1976). By the early 1980s, he was selected for the lead role in Bird of Prey, an early computer-conspiracy thriller. His character Henry Jay was reprised in Bird of Prey 2 (1984). In 1981, he also gave a memorable performance as Chilean secret police victim William Beausire in an edition of the BBC Prisoners of Conscience series. Griffiths went on to supporting roles in a number of major films, including The French Lieutenant's Woman, Chariots of Fire and Gandhi. On stage, in 1985–1986, he performed the role of Verdi in Julian Mitchell's After Aida, in Wales and at the Old Vic Theatre in London. He appeared in The World of Peter Rabbit and Friends.

Griffiths' film roles were in both contemporary and period pieces, such as Gorky Park (1983), Withnail and I (1987), King Ralph (1991), The Naked Gun : The Smell of Fear (1991), Guarding Tess (1994) and Sleepy Hollow (1999). Later, he was seen as Harry Potter's bitter uncle Vernon Dursley in the Harry Potter series, appearing in five of the eight films: Philosopher's Stone, Chamber of Secrets, Prisoner of Azkaban, Order of the Phoenix and Deathly Hallows – Part 1.

He appeared as Inspector Henry Crabbe, disillusioned policeman and pie chef extraordinaire, in Pie in the Sky, a role which was created for him. He also made an extended appearance in the 2005 version of Charles Dickens' Bleak House. In 2004, he originated the role of Hector (the teacher) in Alan Bennett's play The History Boys, directed by Nicholas Hytner, winning the 2005 Laurence Olivier Award for Best Actor. During the play's United States run, he added a Drama Desk Award, an Outer Critics Circle Award and a Tony Award. He reprised his role in the film version, which was released in October 2006. In 2007 he starred in Ballet Shoes with his Harry Potter co-stars Emma Watson and Gemma Jones.

Together with his Harry Potter co-star Daniel Radcliffe, he appeared in a stage revival of Peter Shaffer's Equus at the Gielgud Theatre in London and later from October 2008 in a short run of the play at the Broadhurst Theatre on Broadway, which ended in February 2009. Later, in 2009, he replaced Michael Gambon as W. H. Auden prior to the premiere of The Habit of Art at the National Theatre, once again directed by Hytner.

Griffiths was considered for the part of The Doctor in Doctor Who, following Tom Baker's departure in 1981, but was unavailable. He was strongly considered once again to take on the role of the Eighth Doctor, had the series continued past 1989. He performed in adaptations of the Hitchhiker's Guide to the Galaxy, providing the voice for Slartibartfast for the radio adaptation of Life, the Universe and Everything and playing the Vogon Jeltz in the film version of The Hitchhiker's Guide to the Galaxy. He appeared in Bedtime Stories with Adam Sandler and as a special guest in A Muppets Christmas: Letters to Santa.

In 2005 he asked a member of the audience to leave a performance of Heroes after her phone rang three times. Such interruptions due to audience distractions happened three times in his career.

Griffiths appeared as George II in Disney's Pirates of the Caribbean: On Stranger Tides. He appeared in the first episode of the television series Episodes as Julian Bullard. In April 2012, Griffiths starred, with Danny DeVito, in a revival of the Neil Simon play The Sunshine Boys. The show previewed at the Savoy Theatre from 27 April 2012, opening on 17 May and playing a limited 12-week season until 28 July.

Personal life
Griffiths met Heather Gibson in 1973 and they married in 1980. They had no children. Griffiths was awarded an honorary degree from Teesside University in 2006 and was appointed an Officer of the Order of the British Empire (OBE) in the 2008 New Year Honours.

He was the godfather of comedian Jack Whitehall.

Death
Griffiths died aged 65 at University Hospital Coventry on 28 March 2013 after complications following heart surgery.

Filmography

Film

Television

Theatre

Awards and nominations

References

External links

 
 
 
 
 Actors On Performing – Working in the Theatre Seminar video at American Theatre Wing.org, April 2006

1947 births
2013 deaths
20th-century English male actors
21st-century English male actors
Alumni of Manchester Metropolitan University
Drama Desk Award winners
English male film actors
English male stage actors
English male television actors
English male voice actors
English Roman Catholics
Laurence Olivier Award winners
Officers of the Order of the British Empire
People from Thornaby-on-Tees
Royal Shakespeare Company members
Theatre World Award winners
Tony Award winners